Betty Sue Hagerman is the former head coach of the women's tennis program at Louisiana State University.  Hagerman succeeded Karen Elliot in 1981 and recorded an overall record of 40–36 in three seasons as head coach of the Lady Tigers, including the Louisiana AIAW Championship in 1981. She was succeeded by Phillip Campbell.

References

American tennis coaches
LSU Lady Tigers tennis coaches
Living people
Year of birth missing (living people)